Vojtěch Mozík (born 26 December 1992) is a Czech professional ice hockey defenceman. He is currently under contract with Rögle BK of the Swedish Hockey League (SHL).

Playing career
Undrafted, Mozík played professionally in his native county with BK Mladá Boleslav and HC Plzeň in the Czech Extraliga. On 15 June 2015, Mozík was signed to a two-year entry-level contract with the New Jersey Devils. Mozík made his NHL debut in the following 2015–16 season, playing in 7 scoreless games with the Devils.

After the 2016–17 season, having spent two seasons within the Devils organization primarily assigned to American Hockey League affiliate, the Albany Devils, Mozík left as an impending restricted free agent in agreeing to a one-year contract with Russian club, HC Vityaz of the KHL, on 3 May 2017.

On 2 July 2019, having left the KHL as a free agent, Mozík agreed to a two-year contract with Swedish club, Färjestad BK of the Swedish Hockey League (SHL).

In the final year of his contract with Färjestad BK in the 2020–21 season, Mozík collected just one assist through 16 regular season games before he was released from his contract. On 18 December 2020, Mozík returned to the KHL, securing a one-year contract with HC Kunlun Red Star for the remainder of the season.

In the following 2021–22 season, Mozík continued in the KHL, signing with Admiral Vladivostok and posting three goals and 14 points through 49 regular season games. With Admiral finishing out of contention for the playoffs, Mozík left the club and signed for the remainder of the season in the SHL with Rögle BK on 14 February 2022.

Career statistics

Regular season and playoffs

International

References

External links

1992 births
Living people
Admiral Vladivostok players
Albany Devils players
BK Mladá Boleslav players
Czech ice hockey defencemen
Färjestad BK players
HC Kunlun Red Star players
New Jersey Devils players
Ice hockey players at the 2018 Winter Olympics
Ice hockey players at the 2022 Winter Olympics
Olympic ice hockey players of the Czech Republic
HC Plzeň players
Ice hockey people from Prague
Rögle BK players
Undrafted National Hockey League players
HC Vityaz players
Czech expatriate ice hockey players in Russia
Czech expatriate ice hockey players in the United States
Czech expatriate ice hockey players in Sweden
Czech expatriate sportspeople in China
Expatriate ice hockey players in China